Richard James Oliver (born 16 July 1975), formerly known as Jamie Oliver, is a Welsh artist and former musician. He is known as the former keyboardist of No Devotion and former keyboardist, turntablist and supporting vocalist for the Welsh rock band Lostprophets. Oliver quit the music industry in 2017 in order to focus on his art career.

Early life
Oliver and the band remotely knew each other, as they were part of the same music scene. Oliver used to play bass guitar in small local bands in his late teens, and was offered a place of the lead vocalist in Lee Gaze's first band, Fleshbind; he declined the offer as he had to go to university.

Career

Musician career
The band have stated that Oliver was only added to the band so he could go on tour with them as a photographer, for they were impressed by his work. The band asked their management if they could bring Oliver on tour with them in 2000. They were told they could not afford to take someone who was not part of the band or their crew with them, so Oliver bought a set of turntables and quickly learnt what he needed to play. It is unclear how this occurrence coincides with ex-turntablist DJ Stepzak's departure from the band. As the band themselves worked on the remastered The Fake Sound of Progress, it can be assumed that the notably larger changes in the turntable and sample parts (recorded by Stepzak) compared to the other instruments is due to Oliver's influence on the record.

Oliver was also the keyboard and synthesizer player and founding member of the Welsh/American alternative rock band, No Devotion, whose debut album was released in September 2015 and won the Kerrang! Award for Best Album. He departed the band in 2017 to focus on his art career.

Artist career
Oliver is also an artist and had made quite a successful career before joining Lostprophets. Some of his works have been known to sell for up to £5,000 each. He studied fine art at the University of the West of England, Bristol. As an adolescent he used to take photos of small-town life in his Welsh village of Cilfynydd, in the community of Pontypridd, and painted them back on canvas. Then, as a student, he took interest in adapting the Tales of Mabinogion, traditional Welsh tales, into modern scenes. Oliver has worked with Ian Watkins on all of Lostprophets' artwork since 2003, possibly before, and he drew the pictures found in the booklet of the album Start Something (also used on covers for the "Burn Burn" single) personally.

From 2009, he started to paint again, stating that his new works allowed him to express himself much better as an artist than his older works did. His newer works mostly represent children finding themselves alone in landscapes of war or desolation. Oliver attributes this recurring theme to the fears brought by fatherhood in our current world state. He also mentioned the study of Taoism and meditation helped him develop the new expression technique.

In 2012, Oliver was shortlisted for the Welsh Artist of the Year Award.

Oliver's first showing in America opened in Los Angeles at the Known Gallery, in January 2013, displaying most of his newer works. Oliver also collaborated with the association skate4cancer, painting the piece "Dream, Love, Cure" and selling prints for the charity.

Personal life
Oliver currently resides in Los Angeles with his wife, Michelle.

Discography
Lostprophets

 The Fake Sound of Progress (2001, remaster)
 Start Something (2004)
 Liberation Transmission (2006)
 The Betrayed (2010)
 Weapons (2012)

No Devotion
 Permanence (2015)

References

1975 births
Living people
Lostprophets members
Place of birth missing (living people)
Welsh artists
Welsh keyboardists
People from Pontypridd
No Devotion members